Derya Cıbır (born 14 July 1990 in Çorum) is a Turkish judoka competing in the lightweight (48 kg) division.

At the 2008 European Junior Championship she finished in second place in lightweight (-48 kg) division. Derya Cıbır won a bronze medal at the 2009 Mediterranean Games in Pescara, Italy.

She currently resides in İzmir.

References

External links
 
 

1990 births
Living people
People from Çorum
Turkish female judoka
Olympic judoka of Turkey
Judoka at the 2008 Summer Olympics
Turkish female martial artists
Mediterranean Games bronze medalists for Turkey
Competitors at the 2009 Mediterranean Games
Mediterranean Games medalists in judo
21st-century Turkish women